The Duchy of Urbino was an independent duchy in early modern central Italy, corresponding to the northern half of the modern region of Marche. It was directly annexed by the Papal States in 1625. 

It was bordered by the Adriatic Sea in the east, the Republic of Florence in the west and the Papal States in the south. In 1523 the capital was moved from Urbino to Pesaro.

History 
The birth of the duchy dates back to 1443, by virtue of the appointment of Oddantonio da Montefeltro as Duke of Urbino by Pope Eugene IV. The Duchy had for a long time the city of the same name as its capital, which soon became one of the focal points of the Italian Renaissance, rivaling Florence and Siena as a center of art, culture, and commerce. In 1506 the University of Urbino was founded.

Statistics 
In 1610, a contemporary estimate printed by the Elzevirs gave the duchy's annual income as over 200,000 scudi, and the duke's fortune at St. Leo as 2,000,000 scudi. In 1624, Mercurius Gallicus estimated the revenue of the duchy at 300,000 scudi. In regards to population, Zane estimated 150,000 for the duchy at the start of the 17th century, and the military at 10,000 fighting men, half of whom were soldiers and the other half militia. Three-fourths of the duchy's military force was available for foreign service. In 1591, the military force of the duchy amounted to 13,313 fighting men, of whom 8,300 carried arquebuses and 3,783 wore marions. A contemporary census places the duchy's population in 1598 at 115,121. The last legation census before the dissolution of the duchy gave the population as 220,000 in an area of 5,556 square kilometers (giving nearly 40 people per square kilometer), with Urbino (the urban area) having 12,000 (7,500 in the city proper, 4,500 in the adjacent district). James Dennistoun. "Memoirs of the Dukes of Urbino, Illustrating the Arms, Arts, and Literature of Italy, from 1440 to 1630, Volume 3." Harvard University Press: 1851. Pages 432–433.

In 1574, few to none of the nobility had annual revenues of more than 3,000 scudi, but many burgesses made 300–400 scudi annually. The few merchants were chiefly from outside the duchy. A few years after the loss of the duchy's independence, the papacy drew 100,000 scudi annually from direct and fiscal taxation. The militia at the time number 8,000 infantry and 500 cavalry, plus the garrison of Sinigaglia. Dennistoun, p. 433-434.

List of rulers of Urbino
Lords until 1213, counts thereafter until 1443, thereafter dukes.

See also
 History of Urbino
 Pesaro
 List of historic states of Italy

Notes

References
  Volume One, Volume Two, Volume Three
 History of the popes; their church and state (Volume III) by Leopold von Ranke (Wellesley College Library, 2009)
 Franceschini, G. (1970), I Montefeltro . Milan.
 Ugolini, Filippo, (1859). Storia dei conti e duchi d'Urbino. Florence.
 Ugolini, Filippo, Storia dei conti e duchi d'Urbino – volume 2.

 
States and territories established in 1443
Duchy of Urbino
Montefeltro
2nd millennium in Italy
1443 establishments in Europe
Italian city-states